It's Easier for a Camel... is a 2003 French comedy film written, directed by and starring Valeria Bruni Tedeschi. It was entered into the 25th Moscow International Film Festival. It won the Louis Delluc Prize for Best First Film in 2003.

Tedeschi won prizes for Emerging Narrative Filmmaker and Best Actress at the 2003 Tribeca Film Festival.

Cast
 Valeria Bruni Tedeschi as Federica
 Chiara Mastroianni as Bianca
 Jean-Hugues Anglade as Pierre
 Denis Podalydès as Philippe
 Marisa Bruni Tedeschi as Mother (as Marysa Borini)
 Roberto Herlitzka as Father
 Lambert Wilson as Aurelio
 Pascal Bongard as Priest
 Nicolas Briançon as Director
 Yvan Attal as Man in Park
 Emmanuelle Devos as Philippe's Wife

References

External links
 

2003 films
2003 comedy films
2003 directorial debut films
Films directed by Valeria Bruni Tedeschi
Films produced by Paulo Branco
French comedy films
2000s French-language films
Louis Delluc Prize winners
2000s French films